The Adventure Film Festival is an international film festival in Boulder, Colorado.
Started in 2004 by local climber Jonny Copp who was killed in an avalanche in 2009 while on an expedition in China, the festival predominantly screens films on adventure, environmental activism, and the outdoors.

References

Film festivals in Colorado
Culture of Boulder, Colorado
Tourist attractions in Boulder, Colorado